Where the West Begins is a 1938 American Western film directed by J.P. McGowan in his final feature film as a director.

Plot summary 
After being told by his ranch boss Lynn that she plans to sell her ranch to finance a move east, Jack is framed for cattle rustling by Barnes, the man set to buy the ranch. With the help of his pal Buzz, Jack escapes the noose and the two set out to clear Jack's name. In addition, Jack is suspicious of the reason why Barnes wants to own Lynn's ranch in the first place.

Cast 
Addison Randall as Jack Manning
Fuzzy Knight as Buzz, Jack's Sidekick
Luana Walters as Lynne Reed
Arthur Housman as Beano, Jack's Cellmate
Budd Buster as Sheriff Judson
Kit Guard as Henchman Smiley
Richard Alexander as Barnes
Ralph Peters as Hawkins
Joe Garcia as Henchman Miller
Six-Bar-B Cowboys as Saloon musicians

Soundtrack 
Fuzzy Knight with the Ray Whitley Band - "That's My Idea of Fun" (Written by Connie Lee)
Addison Randall (as Jack Randall) - "Born to the Range" (Written by Johnny Lange and Fred Stryker)
Addison Randall (as Jack Randall), with the Ray Whitley Band - "Sleep Little Cowboy" (Written by Connie Lee)
Addison Randall (as Jack Randall), with the Ray Whitley Band - "Down the Trail to Dreams" (Written by Johnny Lange and Fred Stryker)
Sung by Addison Randall (as Jack Randall), with the Ray Whitley Band - "I'm in Prairie Heaven" (Written by Connie Lee)

External links 

1938 films
1938 Western (genre) films
American black-and-white films
Monogram Pictures films
American Western (genre) films
Films directed by J. P. McGowan
1930s English-language films
1930s American films